Aleksandr Yuryevich Chaiko (Russian: Александр Юрьевич Чайко; born on 27 July 1971) is a Russian army officer who was formerly the commander of the Eastern Military District from 12 November 2021 until he was replaced with Rustam Muradov on October 7, 2022. He was awarded the title Hero of the Russian Federation in 2020, and is a colonel general as of 2021.

He is suspected of organizing massacres in Bucha and other towns around Kyiv during 2022 Russian invasion of Ukraine.

Biography
Aleksandr Chaiko was born on 27 July 1971 in Golitsyno, Moscow Oblast.

In 1988, he graduated from the Moscow Suvorov Military School.

In 1992, he graduated from the Moscow Higher Combined Arms Command School. After graduating from college, he served as a platoon, company commander, battalion chief of staff, battalion commander in the Western Group of Forces and in the Moscow Military District.

He also graduated from the Combined Arms Academy of the Armed Forces of Russian in 2001. From 2001 to 2006, he was the chief of staff of a motorized rifle regiment, commander of a motorized rifle regiment (MVO). He was promoted to a colonel ahead of schedule in 2004. From 2006 to 2007, he was the commander of the 27th separate guards motorized rifle Sevastopol Red Banner brigade named after the 60th anniversary of the USSR, and from November 2007 to May 2009, he was a commander of the 2nd guards motorized rifle Taman Order of the October Revolution, Red Banner, Suvorov Order of the M.I. Kalinin (MVO). In October 2009, he was the head of the 473 district educational center for training junior specialists (PURVO).) He graduated from the Military Academy of the General Staff of the Armed Forces of Russia in 2012.

In June 2013, Chaiko was the Deputy Army Commander of the Central Military District. On 8 July 2014, by the Decree of the President of Russia, he was appointed Commander of the 20th Guards Combined Arms Red Banner Army, after the reconstruction of the 1st Guards Red Banner Tank Army in 2014, he became the Commander of the 1st Guards Red Banner Tank Army of the Western Military District until April 2017. He was promoted to a lieutenant general by Decree of the President of Russia No. 665 dated 12 December 2016.

Chaiko was a member of the Russian Military Operation in Syria. In 2015, he was the first chief of staff of the Grouping of Forces of the Russian Armed Forces Syria.

From April 2017 to November 2018, Chaiko was the Chief of Staff - the First Deputy Commander of the Eastern Military District.

From November 2018 to February 2019, he was the Deputy Chief of the Military Academy of the General Staff of the Armed Forces of Russia.

In February 2019, he became the Deputy Chief of the General Staff of the Armed Forces of Russia.

From September 2019 to November 2020 and from February 2021 to June 2021, he was the Commander of the Group of Forces of the Armed Forces of Russia in Syria.

By the Decree of the President of Russia, No. 355, on 11 June 2021, Chaiko was promoted Colonel General.

On 12 November 2021, Chaiko became the Commander of the Eastern Military District. On 16 November, he officially took office, accepting the standard of the commander of the troops. On August 7, 2022, the United Kingdom Ministry of Defense reported that Chaiko was removed from his post.

Atrocities
Chaiko earned a global reputation as a brutal leader in Syria in 2019 and 2020. Human Rights Watch states that he may be responsible for widespread attacks against hospitals, schools and populated areas in the Idlib Governorate. The attacks killed 1600 civilians and displaced 1.4 million. During the 2022 Russian invasion of Ukraine, troops under Chaiko's command tortured and executed hundreds of Ukrainian civilians during the Kyiv offensive. War crimes prosecutors in Ukraine are researching whether Chaiko directly ordered specific atrocities.

References

External links

1971 births
Living people
Russian colonel generals
Military Academy of the General Staff of the Armed Forces of the Soviet Union alumni
Russian military personnel of the Syrian civil war
People from Odintsovsky District
Heroes of the Russian Federation
Recipients of the Order of Military Merit (Russia)
Recipients of the Medal of Zhukov